The Academy @ Shawnee (formerly, Shawnee High School Magnet Career Academy [MCA]), is a magnet middle school and high school (grades 6-12) in the Jefferson County Public School District in Louisville, Kentucky. It is one of five West Louisville schools selected as part of the Signature Partnership initiative with the University of Louisville. The Academy@ Shawnee also houses the Challenger Learning Center.

The Academy @Shawnee began as a high school and  incorporated a middle school in the fall of 2013.
The school building sits on a large campus and is Gothic-inspired in its architectural design; it was constructed in 1927 and is on the National Register of Historic Places (reference number 84000277). The school had a listed enrollment of 593 students for the 2014/15 school year.

Notable alumni

 Ed Hamilton - World-renowned Sculptor, Class of 1965
 Rudy Macklin - Professional Basketball Player, Class of 1976
 Gerald Neal - Kentucky State Senator, Class of 1963
 Martha Rofheart - American Stage Actress & Historical Novelist, Class of 1933

See also
 Public schools in Louisville, Kentucky

References

External links
The Academy @ Shawnee School Website
The Challenger Learning Center-Located Inside The Academy@Shawnee
24 Months in the Life of a Turnaround School
Tackling Turnaround: Keith Look

Jefferson County Public Schools (Kentucky)
National Register of Historic Places in Louisville, Kentucky
Public high schools in Kentucky
Educational institutions established in 1927
1927 establishments in Kentucky
Public middle schools in Kentucky
School buildings on the National Register of Historic Places in Kentucky
Magnet schools in Kentucky